Scientific American Frontiers was an American science television program aired by PBS from 1990 to 2005. The show was a companion program to the Scientific American magazine, and primarily covered new technology and discoveries in science and medicine. The Chedd-Angier Production Company, which had recently produced Discover: The World of Science, produced the show for PBS. Frontiers typically aired once every two to four weeks.

Hosts

The show first aired on October 1, 1990, with MIT professor Woodie Flowers hosting until the spring of 1993. Actor Alan Alda became the permanent host from the fall season of 1993 and continued until the show ended in 2005. The show was also billed as Alan Alda in Scientific American Frontiers. In one segment, Alda became car sick while driving an experimental, virtual reality vehicle. In 2005, in his memoir, Never Have Your Dog Stuffed: and Other Things I've Learned, Alda recalls his intestines becoming strangulated while in the mountains of Chile for the show, an incident in which he nearly died due to the remote location.

Format

Most programs included three short documentaries, but some shows follow a different pattern. Some young viewers of the program later appeared as adult guests in later series, stating that the program inspired them to continue their scientific pursuits. The shows are now available online at the Chedd-Angier website.

Episodes

Season 1 (1990-91)

Season 2 (1991-92)

Season 3 (1992-93)

Season 4 (1993-94)

Season 5 (1994-95)

Season 6 (1995-96)

Season 7 (1996-97)

Season 8 (1997-98)

Season 9 (1998-99)

Season 10 (1999-2000)

Season 11 (2000-01)

Season 12 (2001-02)

Season 13 (2002-03)

Season 14 (2004)

Season 15 (2005)

Sources

External links
, where all shows and transcripts are freely available for viewing.
Archived site - contains extra interviews, behind-the-scenes information.

References

PBS original programming
1990s American documentary television series
2000s American documentary television series
1990 American television series debuts
2005 American television series endings
Scientific American